The Speaker of the Tasmanian House of Assembly is the presiding officer of the lower house of the Parliament of Tasmania. The role of Speaker has traditionally been a partisan office, filled by the governing party of the time.

Speakers of the Tasmanian House of Assembly

External links
 Speakers of the House of Assembly (Parliament of Tasmania)

Tasmania
 
1856 establishments in Australia